The Franciscan Abbey of Hachenburg was a monastery of the Franciscan order in Hachenburg in the county of Westerwaldkreis in Germany.  The abbey of fratrum minorum observantiae strictioris St. Francisci Seraphici ("Friars Minor of Saint Franciscus Seraphicus of the Stricter Observance") belonged to the Thuringian Franciscan Province of Saint Elisabeth.

Sources 
 Archives of Hachenburg Abbey in the Hessian Main State Archives, Wiesbaden

References

Literature 
 E. Heyn: Der Westerwald. 1893. Niederwalluf, Martin Sändig, Reprint 1970
 Hermann Josef Roth: Der Westerwald. Cologne, DuMont, 1981.
 Daniel Schneider: Die Entwicklung der Konfessionen in der Grafschaft Sayn im Grundriss, in: Heimat-Jahrbuch des Kreises Altenkirchen 58 (2015), pp. 74–80.
 Bruno M. Struif: Vom Franziskanerkloster Sancta Maria Regina Angelorum zur katholischen Kirche Maria Himmelfahrt in Hachenburg, GeschichtsWerkstatt Hachenburg e.V., 2010, 102 pp.

Hachenburg
17th-century establishments in the Holy Roman Empire
History of the Westerwald
Baroque church buildings in Germany
Baroque architecture in Rhineland-Palatinate
Heritage sites in Rhineland-Palatinate
Buildings and structures in Westerwaldkreis